Willy Klein (11 October 1912 – 15 July 2004) was a Luxembourgian gymnast. He competed in eight events at the 1936 Summer Olympics.

References

1912 births
2004 deaths
Luxembourgian male artistic gymnasts
Olympic gymnasts of Luxembourg
Gymnasts at the 1936 Summer Olympics
People from Dudelange